Nebria hellwigii hellwigii is a subspecies of beetle in the family Carabidae found in Austria, Germany, and  Italy.

References

Beetles described in 1803
Beetles of Europe